Kosor may refer to:

Kosor (surname), a surname
Kosoř, a village and municipality in the Czech Republic
Kosor, Mostar, a village just south of Mostar, Bosnia and Herzegovina